Tim Kindberg is a computer scientist, notable for being co-author (together with George Coulouris, Jean Dollimore and Gordon Blair) of one of the standard distributed computer systems textbooks, Distributed Systems. Kindberg has been cited over 10,000 times.

Selected research
Kindberg, Tim, and John Barton. "A web-based nomadic computing system." Computer Networks 35.4 (2001): 443–456.
Kindberg, Tim, et al. "People, places, things: Web presence for the real world." Mobile Networks and Applications 7.5 (2002): 365–376.
Kindberg, Tim, and Armando Fox. "System software for ubiquitous computing." IEEE pervasive computing 1.1 (2002): 70–81.
Kindberg, Tim, et al. "The ubiquitous camera: An in-depth study of camera phone use." IEEE Pervasive Computing 4.2 (2005): 42–50.

References

External links

Living people
Nationality missing
Year of birth missing (living people)
Place of birth missing (living people)
Computer scientists
Textbook writers